Ananteris sabineae is a species of scorpion. It is closely related to Ananteris pydanieli, and is often described in relation to it. It has a pale pigmentation of its pedipalps and legs, and a carapace with darker pigmentation and less conspicuous yellow spots.

References 

 

Buthidae
Animals described in 2001
Arthropods of South America
Fauna of French Guiana
Scorpions of South America